Ixophorus is a genus of Latin American plants in the grass family. The only recognized species is Ixophorus unisetus. Some authors have included one or two other species in the genus, such as I. pringlei, but these have more recently been reduced to synonymy. Common names for I. unisetus include crane grass, turkey grass, Honduras grass, Mexican grass, Central America grass, hático (Colombia), zacate blanco (El Salvador, Honduras, Mexico), and zacate chompipe (Nicaragua).

This grass is native to Mexico, Central America, Cuba, Puerto Rico, and Colombia. It is an introduced species in Hawaii.

The grass is variable. It can be annual or perennial, growing up to 1.5 meters tall or remaining much shorter. The stem can be up to a centimeter wide and dry to nearly succulent. The inflorescence is an open panicle with up to 50 branches.

This grass is grown for grazing and hay in some places, such as Costa Rica.

formerly included
several taxa once regarded as members of Ixophorus but now regarded as better suited to other genera: Pennisetum Setaria 
 Ixophorus glaucus – Pennisetum glaucum 
 Ixophorus glaucus var. laevigatus – Setaria parviflora 
 Ixophorus italicus – Setaria italica 
 Ixophorus verticillatus – Setaria verticillata 
 Ixophorus viridis – Setaria viridis

References

External links
 Grassbase - The World Online Grass Flora

Panicoideae
Grasses of North America
Grasses of South America
Grasses of Mexico
Flora of Central America
Flora of the Caribbean
Monotypic Poaceae genera